Lakaro is an area of Safi Tehsil, Mohmand Agency, Federally Administered Tribal Areas, Pakistan.

References 

Populated places in Mohmand District